is a town located in Nishikasugai District, Aichi Prefecture, Japan. , the town had an estimated population of 15,630 in 6,757 households, and a population density of 2,529 persons per km².

Geography
Toyoyama is located in the flatlands of central Aichi Prefecture.  A third of the area of the town is occupied by Nagoya Airfield.

Neighboring municipalities
Aichi Prefecture
Nagoya – Kita-ku
Kasugai
Kitanagoya
Komaki

Demographics
Per Japanese census data, the population of Toyoyama has been increasing over the past 20 years.

Climate
The town has a climate characterized by characterized by hot and humid summers, and relatively mild winters (Köppen climate classification Cfa).  The average annual temperature in Toyoyama is 15.8 °C. The average annual rainfall is 1713 mm with September as the wettest month. The temperatures are highest on average in August, at around 28.2 °C, and lowest in January, at around 4.4 °C.

History
Aoyama and Toyoba villages were created within Nishikasugai District, Aichi with the establishment of the modern municipalities system on October 1, 1889. The town villages merged to form the village of Toyoyama on July 16, 1906. Toyoyama was elevated to town status on April 1, 1972.

Economy
Mitsubishi Heavy Industries Aerospace Division assembles the Mitsubishi Regional Jet in Toyoyama. Nakanihon Air Service, a general aviation operator, is also located in Toyoyama on the airport grounds. Toyoyama is also home to the Nagoya Central Wholesale Market.

Education
 Toyoyama has three public elementary schools and one public high school operated by the town government.

Transportation

Airport
Nagoya Airfield

Railway
Toyoyama does not have any passenger railway service.

Highway

  Route 11 (Nagoya Expressway)

Notable people from Toyoyama
Ichiro Suzuki, baseball player.
Tae Honma, professional wrestler

References

External links

 

 
Towns in Aichi Prefecture